Tobias van Gent (born 14 January 1967) is a Dutch historian and politician, currently serving as a Member of Parliament for the People's Party for Freedom and Democracy (VVD, Volkspartij voor Vrijheid en Democratie) since 5 September 2018. He served in the provincial council of Zeeland from March 2011 to March 2019.

References

Living people
1967 births
Members of the House of Representatives (Netherlands)
People's Party for Freedom and Democracy politicians